Metal Masters is a 2D fighting video game first released in 1991 for the Atari ST, IBM PC, and Amiga. It was ported to the Nintendo Game Boy in 1993.

Plot
The story starts with a villain called the Baron, the Baron is looking for the parts needed to construct the ultimate robot.  The player's job is to destroy the robots, thus destroying the parts needed by the Baron.

Gameplay
The player controls a robot, the starting robot is a very basic model, to which the player can add "improvements" with credits earned during gameplay.  There are four areas that each robot is graded on, body, left arm, right arm, and legs.  There are several different combinations of various parts that can be added to the player's robot for optimum fighting status.  During a fight, each area mentioned above is represented by its own health meter.  The objective of the player is to deplete the health meters of each area.

Reception
The One reviewed the home computer versions of Metal Masters in 1991, praising the graphics as "impressively animated and colourful", and expresses that Metal Masters is an "unusual" beat 'em up in that it's more enjoyable in two-player mode, furthermore calling it a game "for which a good deal of practice pays off." The One however criticises the 'clanking' sound effects of robots walking as 'grating' and expresses that the game feels too slow, concluding by stating that  "Ultimately however, the slight slowness of robot maneuverability make what could have been a great battle merely a decent one."

References

External links
 Metal Masters (Game Boy version) at GameFAQs
 Metal Masters at Lemon Amiga
 Metal Masters at Atari Mania

1991 video games
Amiga games
Atari ST games
DOS games
Electro Brain games
Fighting games
Game Boy games
Infogrames games
North America-exclusive video games
Science fiction video games
Single-player video games
Video games about mecha
Video games developed in Spain
Video games scored by Alberto Jose González